The Hawera and Normanby Star is a newspaper published in Taranaki, New Zealand.

History 
The newspaper was first published on 10 April 1880. It ceased publication as a commercial newspaper in 1977, after which it has continued as a community newspaper.

References 

Newspapers published in New Zealand
Taranaki
Newspapers established in 1880
1880 establishments in New Zealand